DYMS (105.3 FM), broadcasting as MSFM 105.3, is a radio station owned and operated by PEC Broadcasting Corporation. The station's studio is located along #198-B Mabini Ave., Catbalogan.

References

Radio stations in Samar (province)